Hot Love may refer to:

"Hot Love" (T. Rex song)
"Hot Love" (Five Star song)
"Hot Love" (Twisted Sister song)
 "Hot Love", a song by Cheap Trick
Hot Love, a film by German director Jörg Buttgereit